Estadio La Libertad is a football only stadium in Bata, Equatorial Guinea.  It is currently used mostly for football matches.  The stadium has a capacity of 4,000 people and is a small municipal stadium in the centre of Bata and located near the sea across the road from Hotel Panafrica.  An artificial pitch was installed at the stadium in August 2010.
The stadium consists of 3 separate pavilions with the north end open.

Football venues in Equatorial Guinea
Buildings and structures in Bata, Equatorial Guinea